Charlton School is a coeducational secondary school located in Telford, Shropshire, England.

In May 2015 the school was placed in special measures after being graded "Inadequate" by Ofsted.

Charlton School works in partnership with Dothill Primary School, forming the 'Dothill and Charlton Sports and Learning Community'. However, as of September 2015 both schools have their own leadership.

History
Founded in 1962 as Wellington Girls' Modern School, the school was originally an all-girls school. In 1974 it became co-educational and was renamed The Charlton School.

The school's catchment area includes the small towns surrounding it like Wellington and Bratton. In 2003 a sports hall was built and in the following year the school became a Science College.

From 2016, the school is located on a purpose-built site on the previous Blessed Robert Johnson School in Wellington.

Previously a foundation school administered by Telford and Wrekin Council, in December 2018 Charlton School converted to academy status. The school is now sponsored by the Learning Community Trust.

In November 2020, footage circulated on social media reportedly showing a Sikh student being attacked by two students in Charlton School uniform. West Mercia Police confirmed they were aware of the video and were treating it as a hate crime.
Charlton School said it had taken "swift, immediate and appropriate action" over the incident on 13 November, including sanctions and targeted intervention for the perpetrators.

References

External links
Ofsted Reports
Department for Children, Schools and Families Performance Tables

Secondary schools in Telford and Wrekin
Academies in Telford and Wrekin
Schools in Telford
Wellington, Shropshire